V4024 Sagittarii is a single variable star in the southern constellation of Sagittarius. It has a blue-white hue and is dimly visible to the naked eye with an apparent visual magnitude that fluctuates from about 5.3 to 5.6. The star is located at a distance of approximately 1,700 light years based on stellar parallax, but is drifting closer with a radial velocity of −20 km/s. The position of this star near the ecliptic means it is subject to lunar occultations.

This object is a massive Be star with a stellar classification of B2Ve. The 'e' suffix indicates the spectrum of the star displays emission lines, which are created by materials ejected from the equatorial region of this rapidly rotating star. It is classified as an eruptive Gamma Cassiopeiae variable and has been measured ranging in brightness from visual magnitude 5.34 down to 5.60. The star is an estimated 5 million years old with 8.8 times the mass of the Sun and about 4.5 times the Sun's radius. It is spinning with a projected rotational velocity of 105 m/s. V4024 Sagittarii is radiating 7,551 times the luminosity of the Sun from its photosphere at an effective temperature of 18,100 K. Koen and Eyer examined the Hipparcos data for this star, and found that its brightness varied with a period of 1.7733 days.

References

B-type main-sequence stars
Be stars
Gamma Cassiopeiae variable stars

Sagittarius (constellation)
Durchmusterung objects
172910
093996
7249
Sagittarii, V4024